Severn crossing is a term used to refer to the two motorway crossings over the River Severn estuary between England and Wales operated by England's National Highways. The two crossings are:
Severn Bridge 
Prince of Wales Bridge, until 2018 known as the Second Severn Crossing (Ail Groesfan Hafren).

The first motorway suspension bridge was inaugurated on 8 September 1966, and the newer cable-stayed bridge, a few miles to the south, was inaugurated on 5 June 1996. The Second Severn Crossing marks the upper limit of the Severn Estuary and was officially renamed the Prince of Wales Bridge on 2 July 2018. From 1966 to 1996, the first bridge, from Aust on the English side to Chepstow, carried the M4 motorway. On completion of the Second Severn crossing, the motorway crossing the first bridge was renamed the M48.

The two Severn crossings are regarded as the main crossing points from England into South Wales. Before 1966 road traffic between the southern counties of Wales and the southern counties of England had either to travel via Gloucester or to take the Aust Ferry, which ran roughly along the line of the Severn Bridge, from Old Passage near Aust to Beachley. The ferry ramps at Old Passage and Beachley are still visible.

Until 17 December 2018, tolls were collected on both crossings from vehicles travelling in a westward direction only; the toll for small vehicles was £5.60. The Severn Crossing reverted to public ownership on 8 January 2018, run by National Highways.

Railway crossings 
The Severn Tunnel, carrying mainline trains under the Severn along the South Wales Main Line has been followed in its original route by the Second Severn Crossing.  

From 1879 until its collapse in 1960 the Severn Railway Bridge also carried trains across the Severn from Sharpness to Lydney.

Future

Severn Barrage proposal

A proposed Severn Barrage could constitute a third crossing. It has been suggested that such a barrage could carry a road crossing. Until recently, a rail link over a barrage had been ruled out because it would contain a huge set of shipping locks that the rails would need to traverse. It has since been suggested that a rail bridge could carry smaller, modern trains over the locks, making a rail link possible.  

However, a report by the Department of Transport as part of the 2008–2010 Severn Tidal Power feasibility study carried out by the Department for Energy and Climate Change, concluded that there was no need for new transport links, either by road or rail. As the UK Government opted not to pursue a tidal scheme in the Severn Estuary after the report was published, it seems unlikely that a third crossing will be built in the near future.

2018 Third Severn Crossing proposal
The county of Gloucestershire's 2050 Vision was launched in 2018, and contains a proposal for a third Severn Crossing between Lydney and Sharpness. This would replicate the former Severn Bridge Railway.

See also
Aust Severn Powerline Crossing
List of crossings of the River Severn
List of bridges in Wales

References

External links
 

River Severn
Former toll bridges in England
Former toll bridges in Wales